The Lammefjord is a polder in Denmark at the base of the Odsherred peninsula. Previously a deeply branched arm of the sea leading west from the Isefjord, most of it is now reclaimed as agricultural land. The eastern third, outside the dyke at Avdebo, is still sea, but the name Lammefjorden now usually refers only to the dry part west of the dyke.

The sandy former sea bed is excellent agricultural land, especially for crops such as carrots and potatoes.

The draining project began in 1873, but it took until 1943 before the lowest elevations were pumped dry. Large parts of the fjord were shallow enough to be dry early on. In 1899 the Odsherred Railway opened across the western end of the fjord. The town of Fårevejle Stationsby grew up where the railway intersects that main road across the seabed; it serves as the administrative and mercantile center for much of the Lammefjord.

It is also in running for the lowest in the European Union (shared with Zuidplaspolder in the Netherlands).

See also 
 Extreme points of the European Union
 List of countries by lowest point
 Table of elevation extremes by country

References 

Geography of Zealand
Lowest points
Former bays
Land reclamation in Denmark
Geography of Holbæk Municipality
Geography of Odsherred Municipality